San Idelfonso Creek is a small stream of water located in Webb County, Texas which runs through Laredo, Texas. The creek is formed within east Laredo and runs southwest for 8 miles until connecting to the Rio Grande. San Ildefonso Creek was dammed in east Laredo to form San Ildefonso Creek Lake, the second largest Lake in Laredo. The terrain surrounding the creek is mostly clay and sandy loams. The vegetation surrounding the creek is mostly made up of mesquite, cacti, chaparral, hardwoods and grasses. San Idelfonso Creek crosses two major highways in Laredo, Texas among them are: Texas State Highway 359 and United States Route 83

Coordinates
 Source:  Laredo, Texas
 Mouth:  Rio Grande at Laredo, Texas

See also
 List of tributaries of the Rio Grande
 List of rivers of Texas

References

Tributaries of the Rio Grande
Geography of Laredo, Texas
Rivers of Texas